The three teams in this group played against each other on a home-and-away basis. Czechoslovakia and Scotland finished level on points and advanced to a play-off on neutral ground to decide who would qualify. The winner (Czechoslovakia) qualified for the seventh FIFA World Cup held in Chile.

Standings

Matches

 

 

 

 

 

Czechoslovakia and Scotland finished level on points, and a play-off on neutral ground was played to decide who would qualify.

References

External links
FIFA official page
RSSSF – 1962 World Cup Qualification
Allworldcup

8
1960–61 in Czechoslovak football
Qual
1960–61 in Scottish football
1961–62 in Scottish football
1960–61 in Republic of Ireland association football
1961–62 in Republic of Ireland association football